Minburn is a hamlet in central, Alberta, Canada within the County of Minburn No. 27.

History 
Minburn was incorporated as a village on June 24, 1919. It dissolved from village status on July 1, 2015, to become a hamlet under the jurisdiction of the County of Minburn No. 27.

Demographics 

As a designated place in the 2016 Census of Population conducted by Statistics Canada, Minburn had a population of 115 living in 49 of its 49 total private dwellings, a  change from its 2011 population of 105.

See also 
List of communities in Alberta
List of former urban municipalities in Alberta
List of hamlets in Alberta

References 

 

1919 establishments in Alberta
2015 disestablishments in Alberta
County of Minburn No. 27
Designated places in Alberta
Former villages in Alberta
Hamlets in Alberta
Populated places disestablished in 2015